The year 1850 in architecture involved some significant architectural events and new buildings.

Events
 November 1 – Foundation stone laid for church of All Saints, Margaret Street, London, designed by William Butterfield. supervised by Beresford Hope for the Cambridge Camden Society as a model of the High Victorian Gothic ecclesiological style.

Buildings and structures

Buildings completed

 Bratsberg Church, Trondheim, Norway.
 Hillsgrove Covered Bridge, Pennsylvania, USA.
 Britannia Bridge in North Wales, engineered by Robert Stephenson, is opened.
 Newcastle railway station in the north-east of England, designed by John Dobson, is opened.
 Sainte-Geneviève Library in Paris, designed by Henri Labrouste, is completed, the first major public building with an exposed cast-iron frame.
 Château de Boursault, France, designed by Jean-Jacques Arveuf-Fransquin.
 Peckforton Castle, England, designed by Anthony Salvin.
 Vĩnh Tràng Temple, Mỹ Tho, Vietnam.

Awards
 Grand Prix de Rome, architecture – Victor Louvet
 RIBA Royal Gold Medal – Charles Barry

Births
 January 10 – John Wellborn Root, Chicago-based US architect (died 1891)
 February 17 – Frank Darling, Canadian architect associated with Toronto (died 1923)
 November 15 – Victor Laloux, French Beaux-Arts architect and teacher (died 1937)
 December 21 – Lluís Domènech i Montaner, Spanish-Catalan architect, a leader of Modernisme català, the Catalan Art Nouveau/Jugendstil movement (died 1927)
 Robert Worley, English architect (died 1930)

Deaths
 February 19 – François Debret, French architect (born 1777)
 March 2 – Auguste-Henri-Victor Grandjean de Montigny, French architect influential in Brazil (born 1776)
 May 8 – Antonio Niccolini, Italian architect, scenic designer, and engraver (born 1772)
 July 12 – Robert Stevenson, Scottish lighthouse engineer (born 1772)
 September 5 — John Holden Greene, American architect based in Providence, Rhode Island (born 1777)

References

Architecture
Years in architecture
19th-century architecture